The Wild Hunt is a folklore motif (Motif E501 in Stith Thompson's Motif-Index of Folk-Literature) that occurs in the folklore of various northern European cultures. Wild Hunts typically involve a chase led by a mythological figure escorted by a ghostly or supernatural group of hunters engaged in pursuit. The leader of the hunt is often a named figure associated with Odin in Germanic legends, but may variously be a historical or legendary figure like Theodoric the Great, the Danish king , the dragon slayer Sigurd, the Welsh psychopomp , biblical figures such as Herod, Cain, Gabriel, or the Devil, or an unidentified lost soul or spirit either male or female. The hunters are generally the souls of the dead or ghostly dogs, sometimes fairies, valkyries, or elves.

Seeing the Wild Hunt was thought to forebode some catastrophe such as war or plague, or at best the death of the one who witnessed it. People encountering the Hunt might also be abducted to the underworld or the fairy kingdom. In some instances, it was also believed that people's spirits could be pulled away during their sleep to join the cavalcade.

The concept was developed by Jacob Grimm in his  (1835) on the basis of comparative mythology. Grimm believed that a group of stories represented a folkloristic survival of Germanic pagan tradition, but comparable folk myths are found throughout Northern, Western and Central Europe. Grimm popularised the term  ('Wild Hunt') for the phenomenon.

Comparative evidence and terminology

Germanic tradition 
The term 'Hunt' was more common in northern Germany and 'Host' was more used in the south; with however no clear dividing line since parts of southern Germany know the 'Hunt', and parts of the north know the 'Host'. The Wild Hunt is also known from post-medieval folklore.

 At the very front, rides Guro Rysserova, often called Guro Åsgard, who is "big and horrid, her horse black and called Skokse (...)"

Europe 
In the Welsh folklore,  was depicted as a wild huntsman riding a demon horse who hunts souls at night along with a pack of white-bodied and red-eared 'dogs of hell'. In Arthurian legends, he is the king of the Underworld who makes sure that the imprisoned devils do not destroy human souls.

The Old French name  was probably borrowed from Middle English  (Old English ) by the Romance-speaking Norman invaders of Britain.

In the Netherlands and Flanders (in northern Belgium), the Wild Hunt is known as the Buckriders (Dutch: Bokkenrijders) and was used by gangs of highwaymen for their advantage in the 1700s.

Historiography

The concept of the Wild Hunt was first documented by the German folklorist Jacob Grimm, who first published it in his 1835 book Deutsche Mythologie. It was in this work that he popularized the term Wilde Jagd ("Wild Hunt") for the phenomenon. Grimm's methodological approach was rooted in the idea – common in nineteenth-century Europe – that modern folklore represented a fossilized survival of the beliefs of the distant past. In developing his idea of the Wild Hunt, he mixed together recent folkloric sources with textual evidence dating to the Medieval and Early Modern periods. This approach came to be criticized within the field of folkloristics during the 20th century, as more emphasis was placed on the "dynamic and evolving nature of folklore".

Grimm interpreted the Wild Hunt phenomenon as having pre-Christian origins, arguing that the male figure who appeared in it was a survival of folk beliefs about the god Wodan, who had "lost his sociable character, his near familiar features, and assumed the aspect of a dark and dreadful power... a specter and a devil." Grimm believed that this male figure was sometimes replaced by a female counterpart, whom he referred to as Holda and Berchta. In his words, "not only Wuotan and other gods, but heathen goddesses too, may head the furious host: the wild hunter passes into the wood-wife, Wôden into frau Gaude." He added his opinion that this female figure was Woden's wife.

Discussing martial elements of the Wild Hunt, Grimm commented that "it marches as an army, it portends the outbreak of war." He added that a number of figures that had been recorded as leading the hunt, such as "Wuotan, Huckelbernd, Berholt, bestriding their white war-horse, armed and spurred, appear still as supreme directors of the war for which they, so to speak, give license to mankind."

Grimm believed that in pre-Christian Europe, the hunt, led by a god and a goddess, either visited "the land at some holy tide, bringing welfare and blessing, accepting gifts and offerings of the people" or they alternately float "unseen through the air, perceptible in cloudy shapes, in the roar and howl of the winds, carrying on war, hunting or the game of ninepins, the chief employments of ancient heroes: an array which, less tied down to a definite time, explains more the natural phenomenon." He believed that under the influence of Christianisation, the story was converted from being that of a "solemn march of gods" to being "a pack of horrid spectres, dashed with dark and devilish ingredients". A little earlier, in 1823, Felicia Hemans records this legend in her poem The Wild Huntsman, linking it here specifically to the castles of Rodenstein and Schnellerts, and to the Odenwald.

In the influential book Kultische Geheimbünde der Germanen (1934), Otto Höfler argued that the German motifs of the 'Wild Hunt' should be interpreted as the spectral troops led by the god Wuotan, which had a ritualistic counterpart in the living bands of ecstatic warriors (Old Norse berserkir), allegedly in a cultic union with the dead warriors of the past.

Hans Peter Duerr (1985) noted that for modern readers, it "is generally difficult to decide, on the basis of the sources, whether what is involved in the reports about the appearance of the Wild Hunt is merely a demonic interpretation of natural phenomenon, or whether we are dealing with a description of ritual processions of humans changed into demons." Historian Ronald Hutton noted that there was "a powerful and well-established international scholarly tradition" which argued that the Medieval Wild Hunt legends were an influence on the development of the Early Modern ideas of the Witches' Sabbath. Hutton nevertheless believed that this approach could be "fundamentally challenged".

Attestations

Germany
An abundance of different tales of the Wild Hunt has been recorded in Germany. The leader, often called der Schimmelreiter, is generally identified with the god Wotan, but sometimes with a feminine figure: the wife of Wotan, Holda ('the friendly one'; also Holle or Holt), Fru Waur, or Fru Gode in Northern Germany; or Perchta (the bright one; also Berchta, Berhta or Berta) in Southern Germany. The leader also is sometimes an undead noble, most often called Count Hackelberg or Count Ebernburg, who is cursed to hunt eternally because of misbehaviour during his lifetime, and in some versions died from injuries of a slain boar's tusk.

Dogs and wolves were generally involved. In some areas, werewolves were depicted as stealing beer and sometimes food in houses. Horses were portrayed as two-, three-, six-, and eight-legged, often with fiery eyes. In the 'Host' variants, principally found in southern Germany, a man went out in front, warning people to get out of the streets before the coming of the Host's armed men, who were sometimes depicted as doing battle with one another. A feature peculiar to the 'Hunt' version, generally encountered in northern Germany, was the pursuit and capture of one or more female demons, or a hart in some versions, while some others did not have prey at all.

Sometimes, the tales associate the hunter with a dragon or the devil. The lone hunter (der Wilde Jäger) is most often riding a horse, seldom a horse-drawn carriage, and usually has several hounds in his company. If the prey is mentioned, it is most often a young woman, either guilty or innocent. Gottfried August Bürger's ballad Der wilde Jäger describes the fate of a nobleman who dares to hunt on the Sabbath and finds both a curse and a pack of demons deep in the woods.

The majority of the tales deal with some person encountering the Wild Hunt. If this person stands up against the hunters, he will be punished. If he helps the hunt, he will be awarded money, gold, or, most often, a leg of a slain animal or human, which is often cursed in a way that makes it impossible to be rid of it. In this case, the person has to find a priest or magician able to ban it or trick the Wild Hunt into taking the leg back by asking for salt, which the hunt can not deliver. In many versions, a person staying right in the middle of the road during the encounter is safe.

Scandinavia

In Scandinavia, the leader of the hunt was Odin and the event was referred to as Odens jakt (Odin's hunt) and Oskoreia (from Asgårdsreien – the Asgard Ride). Odin's hunt was heard but rarely seen, and a typical trait is that one of Odin's dogs was barking louder and a second one fainter. Besides one or two shots, these barks were the only sounds that were clearly identified. When Odin's hunt was heard, it meant changing weather in many regions, but it could also mean war and unrest. According to some reports, the forest turned silent and only a whining sound and dog barks could be heard.

In western Sweden and sometimes in the east as well, it has been said that Odin was a nobleman or even a king who had hunted on Sundays and therefore was doomed to hunt down and kill supernatural beings until the end of time. According to certain accounts, Odin does not ride, but travels in a wheeled vehicle, specifically a one-wheeled cart.

In parts of Småland, it appears that people believed that Odin hunted with large birds when the dogs got tired. When it was needed, he could transform a bevy of sparrows into an armed host.

If houses were built on former roads, they could be burnt down, because Odin did not change his plans if he had formerly travelled on a road there. Not even charcoal kilns could be built on disused roads, because if Odin was hunting the kiln would be ablaze.

One tradition maintains that Odin did not travel further up than an ox wears his yoke, so if Odin was hunting, it was safest to throw oneself onto the ground in order to avoid being hit, a pourquoi story that evolved as an explanation for the popular belief that persons lying at ground level are safer from lightning strikes than are persons who are standing. In Älghult in Småland, it was safest to carry a piece of bread and a piece of steel when going to church and back during Yule. The reason was that if one met the rider with the broad-rimmed hat, one should throw the piece of steel in front of oneself, but if one met his dogs first, one should throw the pieces of bread instead.

Britain 
In the Peterborough Chronicle, there is an account of the Wild Hunt's appearance at night, beginning with the appointment of a disastrous abbot for the monastery, Henry d'Angely, in 1127:

Reliable witnesses were said to have given the number of huntsmen as twenty or thirty, and it is said, in effect, that this went on for nine weeks, ending at Easter. Orderic Vitalis (1075–c. 1142), an English monk cloistered at St Evroul-en-Ouche, in Normandy, reported a similar cavalcade seen in January 1091, which he said were "Herlechin's troop" (familia Herlechini; cf. Harlequin).

While these earlier reports of Wild Hunts were recorded by clerics and portrayed as diabolic, in late medieval romances, such as Sir Orfeo, the hunters are rather from a faery otherworld, where the Wild Hunt was the hosting of the fairies; its leaders also varied, but they included Gwydion, Gwynn ap Nudd, King Arthur, Nuada, King Herla, Woden, the Devil and Herne the Hunter. Many legends are told of their origins, as in that of "Dando and his dogs" or "the dandy dogs": Dando, wanting a drink but having exhausted what his huntsmen carried, declared he would go to hell for it. A stranger came and offered a drink, only to steal Dando's game and then Dando himself, with his dogs giving chase. The sight was long claimed to have been seen in the area. Another legend recounted how King Herla, having visited the Fairy King, was warned not to step down from his horse until the greyhound he carried jumped down; he found that three centuries had passed during his visit, and those of his men who dismounted crumbled to dust; he and his men are still riding, because the greyhound has yet to jump down.

The myth of the Wild Hunt has through the ages been modified to accommodate other gods and folk heroes, among them King Arthur and, more recently, in a Dartmoor folk legend, Sir Francis Drake. At Cadbury Castle in Somerset, an old lane near the castle was called King Arthur's Lane and even in the 19th century, the idea survived that on wild winter nights the king and his hounds could be heard rushing along with it.

In certain parts of Britain, the hunt is said to be that of hell-hounds chasing sinners or the unbaptized. In Devon these are known as Yeth (Heath) or Wisht Hounds, in Cornwall Dando and his Dogs or the Devil and his Dandy Dogs, in Wales the Cwn Annwn, the Hounds of Hell, and in Somerset as Gabriel Ratchets or Retchets (dogs). In Devon the hunt is particularly associated with Wistman's Wood.

Interpretations 
According to scholar Susan Greenwood, the Wild Hunt "primarily concerns an initiation into the wild, untamed forces of nature in its dark and chthonic aspects."

Leader of the Wild Hunt
 Brittany: King Arthur.
 Catalonia (Spain): Count Arnau (el comte Arnau), a legendary nobleman from Ripollès, who for his rapacious cruelty and lechery is condemned to ride with hounds for eternity while his flesh is devoured by flames. He is the subject of a classic traditional Catalan ballad.
 England: Woden; Herla; later de-heathenised as a Brythonic King who stayed too long at a fairy wedding feast and returned to find centuries had passed and the lands populated by Englishmen); Wild Edric, a Saxon rebel; Hereward the Wake; King Arthur; Herne the Hunter; St. Guthlac; Old Nick; Jan Tregeagle, a Cornish lawyer who escaped from Hell and is pursued by the devil's hounds. On Dartmoor, Dewer, Old Crockern or Sir Francis Drake.
 France: Artus, King Arthur (Brittany); Mesnée d’Hellequin (Hauts-de-France)
 Germany: Wodan, Berchtold, Dietrich of Berne, Holda, Perchta, Wildes Gjait. The Squire of Rodenstein and Hans von Hackelberg (both Sabbath-breakers).
 Guernsey: Herodias (Rides with witches at sea)
 Ireland: Fionn mac Cumhaill and the Fianna; Manannán—also known as The Fairy Cavalcade.
 Lombardy (Italy): King Beatrik, la Dona del Zöch (Lombard:the Lady of the Game).
 Netherlands: Wodan, Gait met de hunties/hondjes (Gait with his little dogs), Derk met de hunties/hondjes (Derk with his little dogs), Derk met den beer (Derk with his boar/bear), het Glujende peerd (the glowing horse). Ronnekemère, Henske met de hondjes/Hänske mit de hond (Henske with his little dogs), Berend van Galen (Beerneken van Galen, Bèrndeken van Geulen, Bommen Berend or Beerneken, the bishop of Münster, Germany).
 Scandinavia: Odin; Lussi; King Vold (Denmark); Valdemar Atterdag (Denmark); the witch Guro Rysserova and Sigurdsveinen (Norway).
 Wales: Arawn or Gwyn ap Nudd, the Welsh god of the Underworld.
 Slovenia: Jarnik (Jarilo), also called Volčji pastir (Wolf Herdsman). In some variations the mythical wild Baba (similar to Perchta) leads the hunt; in others, the leader of this retinue is a female character named Pehtra.

Modern influence

On Santa Claus
The role of Wotan's Wild Hunt during the Yuletide period has been theorized to have influenced the development of the Dutch Christmas figure Sinterklaas, and by extension his American counterpart Santa Claus, in a variety of facets. These include his long white beard and his gray horse for nightly rides.

In modern Paganism

Various practitioners of the contemporary Pagan religion of Wicca have drawn upon folklore involving the Wild Hunt to inspire their own rites. In their context, the leader of the Wild Hunt is the goddess Hecate.  The anthropologist Susan Greenwood provided an account of one such Wild Hunt ritual performed by a modern Pagan group in Norfolk during the late 1990s, stating that they used this mythology "as a means of confronting the dark of nature as a process of initiation." Referred to as the "Wild Hunt Challenge" by those running it, it took place on Halloween and involved participants walking around a local area of woodland in the daytime, and then repeating that task as a timed competition at night, "to gain mastery over an area of Gwyn ap Nudd's hunting ground". If completed successfully, it was held that the participant had gained the trust of the wood's spirits, and they would be permitted to cut timber from its trees with which to make a staff. The anthropologist Rachel Morgain reported a "ritual recreation" of the Wild Hunt among the Reclaiming tradition of Wicca in San Francisco.

In popular culture 

The Åsgårdsreien, Peter Nicolai Arbo's 1872 oil painting, depicts the Scandinavian version of the Wild Hunt, with Odin leading the hunting party. This painting is featured on the cover of Bathory's 1988 album, Blood Fire Death.

Music 
The Wild Hunt is the subject of Transcendental Étude No. 8 in C minor, "Wilde Jagd" (Wild Hunt) by Franz Liszt, and appears in Karl Maria von Weber's 1821 opera Der Freischütz and in Arnold Schönberg's oratorio Gurre-Lieder of 1911. César Franck's orchestral tone poem Le Chasseur maudit (The Accursed Huntsman) is based on Gottfried August Bürger's ballad Der wilde Jäger.

In act 1 of Richard Wagner's 1870 opera Die Walküre, Siegmund relates that he has been pursued by “Das wütende Heer”, which is an indication to the audience that it is Wotan himself who has called up the storm which has driven him (Siegmund) to Hunding's dwelling.

The subject of Stan Jones' American country song "Ghost Riders in the Sky" of 1948, which tells of cowboys chasing the Devil's cattle through the night sky, resembles the European myth. 

Swedish folk musician The Tallest Man on Earth released an album in 2010 entitled The Wild Hunt, and in 2013 the black metal band Watain, also Swedish, released an album with the same title.

Comics 
The Wild Hunt appears in Marvel Comics, primarily the Thor series, and is led by Malekith the Accursed, the Dark Elf King of Svartalfheim and one of Thor's archenemies.

In Mike Mignola's comic book series Hellboy, two versions of the Wild Hunt myth are present. In The Wild Hunt, the hero receives an invitation from British noblemen to partake in a giant hunting called "The Wild Hunt", after the legend of "Herne, god of the Hunt". In King Vold, Hellboy encounters "King Vold, the flying huntsman" whose figure is based on the Norwegian folktale of "The Flying Huntsman (headless King Volmer and his hounds)" according to Mignola.

The Wild Hunt was adapted for the Grace Note portion of The Case Files of Lord El-Melloi II anime adaptation with the 4th and 5th episodes where Lord El-Melloi II (voiced by Daisuke Namikawa) helps a fellow magus teacher by the name of Wills Pelham Codrington (voiced by Tomoaki Maeno) in a case involving his father's home where the leylines have become unstable. It is there they encounter Black Dogs, the incarnation of lightning who have been killing people in the vicinity. With the help of his allies, Wills, and a fairy they encounter names Faye, Lord El-Melloi II manages to solve the case and avert the threat.

Film and television 
The Wild Hunt is a Canadian horror drama film of 2009 by director Alexandre Franchi.

The MTV series Teen Wolf features the Wild Hunt as the main villains of the first half of season 6. It takes the legend a bit further, claiming that the Wild Hunt erases people from existence, and those taken by the Wild Hunt become members after they are erased and forgotten.

The Wild Hunt features heavily in Netflix's Little Witch Academia episode "Sky War Stanship", in which the main protagonist Akko Kagari and Constanze Amalie Von Braunschbank Albrechtsberger partake in the hunt itself.

Literature 
In J.R.R. Tolkien's The Hobbit, while traveling through Mirkwood, the dwarves and Bilbo encounter a deer running through the forest, which knocks Bombur into the enchanted river. After they pull him out, they hear far off the sound of a "great hunt" and the baying of dogs going past them.

The hunt plays an important role in four of Jim Butcher's Dresden Files novels: (2005 Dead Beat, 2006 Proven Guilty, 2012 Cold Days and 2020 Battle Ground), In Butcher's cosmos, Santa Claus and Odin are the same being. He shares leadership of the hunt with the Elf King.

Αustralian writer Tim Winton's The Riders (1994), which was shortlisted for the 1995 Booker Prize, mentions a vision of the Wild Hunt that becomes the basis for the main character's own 'wild hunt' of the story.

In The Wheel of Time series (1990-2013), there are stories to frighten children saying that Darkhounds run the night in the "Wild Hunt", with the Dark One himself the hunter.

The Wild Hunt features in The Witcher series of fantasy novels by Andrzej Sapkowski, published in English between 2007 and 2018.

The Wild Hunt has appeared in various publications , among them Alan Garner's 1963 novel The Moon of Gomrath, Uladzimir Karatkievich's King Stakh's Wild Hunt, Penelope Lively's 1971 The Wild Hunt of Hagworthy, Susan Cooper's 1973 The Dark is Rising, Diana Wynne Jones' 1975 Dogsbody, Brian Bates' 1983 The Way of Wyrd, Guy Gavriel Kay's Fionavar trilogy (1984-1986), the third issue of Seanan McGuire's series October Daye, An Artificial Night, Fred Vargas's 2011 The Ghost Riders of Ordebec, Laurell K. Hamilton’s book Mistral's Kiss (2006) and Jane Yolen's 1995 The Wild Hunt. It also features in Cassandra Clare's book series, The Mortal instruments (2007-2014) and The Dark Artifices (2016-2018), led by Gwyn ap Nudd. The Wicked Lovely series (2007-2013) by Melissa Marr contains a modern Wild Hunt. It is also a major plot point in Peter S. Beagle's Tamsin. The Wild Hunt is a primary element of R. S. Belcher's novel The Brotherhood of the Wheel and Raymond E. Feist's 1988 novel Faerie Tale. The Wild Hunt is also an important plot point in the Gilded Duology by Marissa Meyer.
In Clive Barker's novel Coldheart Canyon, the story is centered around a bizarre version of The Wild Hunt. Also in Sharyn McCrummb's novel GhostRiders, The Wild Hunt is depicted by Civil War soldiers who are constantly reliving the war.

Games 
The hunt is featured in CD Projekt Red's 2015 role-playing video game The Witcher 3: Wild Hunt, based on the books, after being referenced heavily during the events and flashbacks of The Witcher and The Witcher 2: Assassins of Kings.

In the original Advanced Dungeons & Dragons (1st Edition) expansion "Deities and Demigods" the Wild Hunt is represented under the Celtic Mythos sections as the Master of the Hunt and the Pack of the Wild Hunt. Players risk a chance of becoming the hunted, or may be compelled to join the Hunt and track down the source of the evil that summoned it, or if that evil isn't found, participate in the slaughter of an innocent person or large game animal, potentially against their alignment and will.

In The Elder Scrolls series of role-playing video games, the Wild Hunt is a ritual performed by the Bosmer (wood elves) for war, vengeance, or other times of desperation. The elves are transformed into a horde of horrific creatures that kill all in their path. The Daedric Lord Hircine is also inspired by the Wild Hunt, especially in The Elder Scrolls III: Morrowind.

The Wild Hunt has been depicted on two different cards in Magic: the Gathering.

The Wild Hunt is heavily featured and elaborated on in the Obsidian Entertainment video game, Pentiment

See also
 Buckriders
 Flying Dutchman
 Four Horsemen of the Apocalypse
 Herne the Hunter
 Hyakki Yagyō
 List of ghosts
 Mallt-y-Nos, a Welsh version of the legend
 Moss people, wood spirits serving as typical prey of the wild hunt in parts of Germany.
 Nightmarchers
 Valkyrie

Notes

References

Footnotes

Bibliography

Further reading 
 Moricet, Marthe. "Récits et contes des veillées normandes". In: Cahier des Annales de Normandie n° 2, 1963. Récits et contes des veillées normandes. pp. 3–210 [177-194]. 
 Jean-Claude Schmitt, Ghosts in the Middle Ages: The Living and the Dead in Medieval Society (1998),  and 
 Carl Lindahl, John McNamara, John Lindow (eds.) Medieval Folklore: A Guide to Myths, Legends, Tales, Beliefs, and Customs, Oxford University Press (2002), p. 432f. 
 Otto Höfler, Kultische Geheimbünde der Germanen, Frankfurt (1934).
 Ruben A. Koman, 'Dalfser Muggen'. – Bedum: Profiel. – With a summary in English, (2006).
 Margherita Lecco, Il Motivo della Mesnie Hellequin nella Letteratura Medievale, Alessandria (Italy), Edizioni dell'Orso, 2001
 HUTTON, RONALD. "THE HOSTS OF THE NIGHT." In: The Witch: A History of Fear, from Ancient Times to the Present. NEW HAVEN; LONDON: Yale University Press, 2017. pp. 120–46. Accessed March 14, 2021. .

External links

 
 
 The Wild Hunt in Orcadian traditional legend at Orkneyjar
 
 Legends of the Wild Hunt by D. L. Ashliman

Odin in art
Celtic mythology
English folklore
French folklore
Spanish folklore
German folklore
Germanic mythology
Germanic paganism
Norse mythology
European ghosts
English ghosts
Welsh ghosts
Irish ghosts
French ghosts
Spanish ghosts
German ghosts
Medieval legends
Hunting
Supernatural legends
Mythological dogs
Mythological canines
Literary motifs
Wicca
Recurring elements in folklore